Wang Qiang  (born 23 July 1984) is a Chinese international footballer as a defender. Wang's twin elder brother Wang Gang is a retired footballer.

Club career
Wang Qiang started his professional football career in the 2003 league season for top-tier side Shenyang Ginde as a  versatile defender and by the 2005 league campaign he established himself as a regular when he played in 21 league games for them. While Shenyang Ginde were often fighting against relegation throughout much of the 2006 Chinese Super League season Wang Qiang was able to cement his position within the team and scored his first league goal against Inter Xian on 22 July 2006 in a 2-1 win during the season. At the beginning of the 2007 league season Shenyang Ginde moved to Changsha and renamed themselves Changsha Ginde, Wang Qiang continued to be a regular fixture within the team and even help them improve from their previous league standing when he helped them finish the league in a respectable 10th. Being a permanent fixture within the team's central defence Wang was  promoted as the club's captain the following season, however his time as captain was not the most productive in the club's history and each season saw the club slip down the table until they were relegated at the end of 2010 Chinese Super League season. Before the start of the 2011 league campaign reigning league title holders Shandong Luneng bought Wang for 5 million yuan.

In December 2015, Wang transferred to China League One side Beijing Renhe with a two-year contract on a free transfer. He extended his contract with the club on 31 December 2017 after Beijing Renhe promoted to the Chinese Super League.

International career
Wang Qiang made his international debut against Palestine on 18 July 2009 in a friendly, which China won 3-1. After that game he became a regular fixture within the national team and was  included in the squad that won the 2010 East Asian Football Championship before being called up to the team that took part in the 2011 AFC Asian Cup.

Career statistics
Statistics accurate as of match played 11 November 2018.

Honours

Club
Shandong Luneng Taishan
Chinese FA Cup: 2014
Chinese FA Super Cup: 2015

International
China PR national football team
 East Asian Football Championship: 2010

References

External links
 
 
Player profile at sohu.com (Chinese)

1984 births
Living people
Chinese footballers
Footballers from Dalian
China international footballers
2011 AFC Asian Cup players
Changsha Ginde players
Shandong Taishan F.C. players
Beijing Renhe F.C. players
Chinese Super League players
China League One players
Twin sportspeople
Chinese twins
Association football defenders